In mathematics, the Jacquet module is a module used in the study of automorphic representations. The Jacquet functor is the functor that sends a linear representation to its Jacquet module. They are both named after Hervé Jacquet.

Definition
The Jacquet module J(V) of a representation (π,V) of a group N is the space of co-invariants of N; or in other words the largest quotient of V on which N acts trivially, or the zeroth homology group H0(N,V). In other words, it is the quotient V/VN where VN is the subspace of V generated by elements of the form π(n)v - v for all n in N and all v in V.

The Jacquet functor J is the functor taking V to its Jacquet module J(V).

Applications

For the general linear group GL(2), the Jacquet module of an admissible irreducible representation has dimension at most two. If the dimension is zero, then the representation is called a supercuspidal representation. If the dimension is one, then the representation is a special representation. If the dimension is two, then the representation is a principal series representation.

References

Representation theory